Under the Constitutional Act of 1791, the district of Trois-Rivières was established.  Its boundaries roughly covered the pre-merger city of Trois-Rivières.

Trois-Rivières was represented simultaneously by two Members at the Legislative Assembly of Lower Canada.

Members for Trois-Rivières (1792-1838) 

{| border="1" cellpadding="5" cellspacing="0" style="border-collapse: collapse border-color: #444444"
|- bgcolor="darkgray"
| 
|Name
|Party
|Election 

|John LeesTory Party1792

|John LeesTory Party1796

|John LeesTory Party1800

|John LeesTory Party1804

|Ezekiel Hart Tory Party1807

|Ezekiel HartTory Party1808

|Mathew BellTory Party1809

|Mathew BellTory Party1810

|Charles Richard OgdenTory Party1814

|Charles Richard OgdenTory Party1816

|Charles Richard OgdenTory PartySpring 1820

|Charles Richard OgdenTory PartySummer 1820

|Étienne RanvoyzéParti Canadien1824

|Charles Richard OgdenTory Party1826

|Charles Richard OgdenTory Party1827

|Charles Richard OgdenTory Party1830

|Jean DesfossésParti Patriote1833

|Edward BarnardParti Patriote<td>1834

|Name<td>Party<td>Election

|Nicolas Saint-Martin<td>Parti Canadien<td>1792

|Pierre-Amable de Bonne<td>Tory Party<td>1796

|Pierre-Amable de Bonne<td>Tory Party<td>1800

|Louis-Charles Foucher<td>Tory Party<td>1804

|Joseph Badeaux<td>Tory Party<td>1808

|Joseph Badeaux<td>Tory Party<td>1809

|Thomas Coffin<td>Tory Party<td>1810

|Amable Berthelot<td>Parti Canadien<td>1814

|Pierre Vézina<td>Tory Party<td>1816

|Marie-Joseph Godefroy de Tonnancour<td>Parti Canadien<td>Spring 1820

|Joseph Badeaux<td>Tory Party<td>Summer 1820

|Amable Berthelot<td>Parti Canadien<td>1824

|Pierre-Benjamin Dumoulin<td>Parti Canadien<td>1827

|Pierre-Benjamin DumoulinParti Canadien1830

|René-Joseph Kimber[[Parti Patriote]]''1832''
{{Canadian party colour|QC|Liberal|row}}
|[[René-Joseph Kimber]]<td>[[Parti Patriote]]<td>[[Legislative Assembly of Lower Canada|1834]]
|}

Footnotes 
{{reflist}}

See also 
 [[History of Canada]]
 [[History of Quebec]]
 [[Mauricie]]
 [[Politics of Canada]]
 [[Politics of Quebec]]
 [[Trois-Rivières, Quebec|Trois-Rivières]]
 [[Trois-Rivières (Province of Canada)|Trois-Rivières Electoral District (Province of Canada - 1841-1867)]]
 [[Trois-Rivières (electoral district)|Trois-Rivières Federal Electoral District (since 1867)]]
 [[Trois-Rivières (provincial electoral district)|Trois-Rivières Provincial Electoral District (since 1867)]]

{{coord |46.3|N|72.6|W|display=title}}

{{DEFAULTSORT:Trois-Rivieres (Lower Canada)}}
[[Category:Electoral districts of Lower Canada]]
[[Category:1792 establishments in Lower Canada]]
[[Category:1838 disestablishments in Lower Canada]]
[[Category:Constituencies established in 1792]]
[[Category:Constituencies disestablished in 1838]]